A mercy shot is a final shot delivered in an execution. It follows after at least one original shot intended to mortally wound or kill the victim. It is considered "merciful" in the sense that it ends the physical suffering of the person being executed. The use of the mercy shot is not universal; due to limited compassion for the victims or due to limited available ammunition, some execution victims are left to die of their wounds or are simply buried alive, without a mercy shot.

References

War